"Mein Blut" (German for "My blood") is a song by German Neue Deutsche Härte band Eisbrecher from their self-titled debut album, and their first single overall.

Track listing 
 Mein Blut (Kurzschnitt) (short edit) – 3:24
 Mein Blut (Album-Schnitt) (album version) – 4:25
 Mein Blut (Pix Mischung) (Pix mix) – 5:42
 Mein Blut (Carlos Perón Neumischung) (Carlos Perón new mix) – 5:38

2003 songs
Eisbrecher songs
2003 debut singles
Songs written by Alexander Wesselsky
Songs written by Noel Pix